Amerila brunnea is a moth of the subfamily Arctiinae. It was described by George Hampson in 1901. It is found in Angola, Benin, Cameroon, the Democratic Republic of the Congo, Gabon, Ghana, Ivory Coast, Kenya, Liberia, Mozambique, Nigeria, Sierra Leone, Tanzania, Togo, Uganda and Zimbabwe.

Subspecies
Amerila brunnea brunnea
Amerila brunnea bipartitoides Häuser & Boppre, 1997 (Kenya, Mozambique, Tanzania, Zimbabwe)

References

Moths described in 1901
Amerilini
Moths of Africa